Fred Garfield Hague (29 September 1911 – 13 November 1984) was a British trade unionist.

Hague was born in Dixon Street, Crossbank, Waterhead, Oldham. He worked as a cotton weaver. He studied at Oldham Technical College and held the honours certificate of the City and Guilds in plain and fancy weaving, and advanced certificates in spinning. He also attended Oldham School of Commerce to study spinners' costings and W.E.A. classes in economics. He then joined the staff of Oldham Technical College as a teacher of cotton weaving.
In 1939 Mr. Hague was appointed organiser and collector for the Shaw district of Oldham Weavers' Association. and joined the Ashton-under-Lyne and District Weavers' Association in 1940.He was elected as its general secretary by the mid-1950s, and also became prominent in the Amalgamated Weavers' Association, to which it was affiliated. He joined the Army in 1940 and on demobilisation in 1945 was appointed to the Middleton branch.
He became a Blackburn magistrate in 1951. He was a governor of Blackburn Technical College, and a member since its inception of the Blackburn Executive Council for the Health Services.

Hague was elected as President of the Weavers' Amalgamation in 1964.  He stood down in 1968 to serve a year as Chairman of the General Federation of Trade Unions, then in 1971 was elected as General Secretary of the Amalgamation.  He negotiated a merger with the National Union of Textile and Allied Workers which formed the Amalgamated Textile Workers' Union, serving as its joint General Secretary for a year, then solo for a further year, when he retired.

He died in Bardsley Vale Avenue Oldham, Lancashire in 1984.

References

1911 births
1984 deaths
General Secretaries of the Amalgamated Weavers' Association
People from Ashton-under-Lyne
Presidents of the Amalgamated Weavers' Association
Presidents of the General Federation of Trade Unions (UK)
People from Bolton